Notaticus is a genus of beetles in the family Dytiscidae and the only genus in the tribe Aubehydrini. The genus is distributed in the lowland tropical areas of South America from Venezuela to Bolivia. The genus contains these two species:

 Notaticus fasciatus Zimmermann, 1928
 Notaticus obscurus García & Navarro, 2001

References

Dytiscidae genera